Maliarpha concinnella, the pure veneer, is a species of snout moth in the genus Maliarpha. It was described by Ragonot in 1888, and is known from Mali, Ghana, Rwanda, the Democratic Republic of the Congo and South Africa.

References

Moths described in 1888
Anerastiini